Centavia (Central European Aviation) was a short-lived Serbian low cost airline. Its hub airport was Belgrade Nikola Tesla Airport in Serbia while its technical base was in Cologne Bonn Airport in Germany. The airline declared bankruptcy on 8 November 2006.

History
Centavia was established in 2005 and received its first aircraft, a BAe 146-200, on 15 June 2006 from Meridiana. Its founder and CEO, Predrag Vujović, had previously attempted to set up an airline company called Air Maxi, but those plans had been abandoned due to a lack of funding.

Centavia's first (charter) flight took place on 8 July 2006, to Belgrade from Corfu. For the initial period, only charter flights were operated. The airline's second aircraft arrived on 17 August 2006 and was registered as YU-AGM.

Centavia was to be the first airline to operate flights from Belgrade to Zagreb since the dissolution of Yugoslavia. However, the Croatian Authorities rejected the airline's application, saying that no bilateral agreements existed between the two states and that the European Open Skies Agreement, ratified by Croatia, would not be applicable in this case. Similarly, the Montenegrin government denied the airline landing rights due to Serbian withdrawal of the AOC of Montenegro Airlines' daughter company, Master Airways, rejection dramatically deteriorated the economic ties between the two former Yugoslav Republics. The airline's demise was seen as collateral damage of the unresolved issues and disputes between the Republics of former Yugoslavia. Only Slovenia approved Centavia's operations request without any difficulties. Centavia was to code share on the Belgrade to Ljubljana flights with Adria Airways of Slovenia.

Centavia had received permissions and landing rights from Slovenia, Germany, Italy and Switzerland and planned to start flights to these states in the winter of 2006.

Centavia also held informal talks with Wizz Air of Hungary to jointly operate certain flights.

Centavia's two leased aircraft were returned to the lessor, BAE Systems, on 9 November 2006.

Fleet
 BAe 146 (2)

External links
Centavia fleet details
 Ovog leta počinju jeftini letovi
 Centavija dobila dozvolu za letenje
 BAE SYSTEMS LEASES TWO BAe 146s TO NEW SERBIAN OPERATOR – CENTAVIA
 BAe 146-200 msn E2210 (Meridiana I-FLRE)
 BAe 146-200 msn E2210 YU-AGL. First comercial [sic] flight of new airline! Charter flight from Corfu. Landing on Rwy 12. Belgrade - Nikola Tesla (Surcin) (BEG / LYBE), Serbia, July 8, 2006
 Centavia's BAe 146-200 YU-AGL landing at Warsaw-Okecie - EPWA, September 4, 2006
 BAe 146-200 msn E2220 (Club Air I-FLRI - last BAe 146 series 200s built before production switched to the Avro RJ85)
 Centavia's BAe 146-200 YU-AGM at Norwich - NWI (Second Centavia BAe 146 ready for delivery), August 15th 2006
 First photo of YU-AGM on Belgrade (Surcin) Airport - BEG, August 23rd 2006
 BAe 146-200 msn E2220 YU-AGM. Still all white - arriving from Belgrade. Kerkyra (Corfu) - Ioannis Kapodistrias (CFU / LGKR), Greece, September 16, 2006

References

Defunct airlines of Serbia
Defunct companies of Serbia
Airlines established in 2005
Airlines disestablished in 2006
Serbian companies established in 2005